Pasquale Di Sabatino (born 26 February 1997) is an Italian footballer who plays as a defender.

Club career
He made his Serie C debut for Ancona on 10 October 2015 in a game against Maceratese.

On 3 August 2019, he signed a 1-year contract with Fano.

On 13 January 2021, he joined Vis Pesaro on a 1.5-year contract.

References

External links
 
 

1997 births
Living people
Sportspeople from the Province of Teramo
Footballers from Abruzzo
Italian footballers
Association football defenders
Serie C players
Delfino Pescara 1936 players
A.C. Ancona players
S.S. Maceratese 1922 players
S.S. Racing Club Fondi players
Ternana Calcio players
Matera Calcio players
Siracusa Calcio players
Alma Juventus Fano 1906 players
Vis Pesaro dal 1898 players